Vietnam participated in the 2010 Asian Games in Guangzhou on 12–27 November 2010.

Medal table

Medalists

Aquatics – Diving

Aquatics – Swimming

Archery

Athletics

Badminton

Board games

Chess

Go

Xiangqi

Boxing

Canoeing

Cue Sports

Cycling

Dance Sports

Fencing

Football

Golf

Gymnastics

Judo

Karate

Rowing

Sepaktakraw

Shooting

Table Tennis

Taekwondo

Tennis

Volleyball

Weightlifting

Wrestling

Wushu

Nations at the 2010 Asian Games
2010
Asian Games